Val Verde Park is a census-designated place (CDP) in Val Verde County, Texas, United States. The population was 2,384 at the 2010 census.

Geography
Val Verde Park is located at  (29.375324, -100.828486).

According to the United States Census Bureau, the CDP has a total area of 0.8 square miles (2.1 km2), all of it land.

Demographics

2020 census

As of the 2020 United States census, there were 2,332 people, 861 households, and 730 families residing in the CDP.

2000 census
As of the census of 2000, there were 1,945 people, 521 households, and 451 families residing in the CDP. The population density was 2,386.1 people per square mile (915.8/km2). There were 590 housing units at an average density of 723.8/sq mi (277.8/km2). The racial makeup of the CDP was 66.68% White, 0.72% African American, 0.82% Native American, 0.05% Pacific Islander, 29.00% from other races, and 2.72% from two or more races. Hispanic or Latino of any race were 86.79% of the population.

There were 521 households, out of which 57.0% had children under the age of 18 living with them, 69.9% were married couples living together, 11.7% had a female householder with no husband present, and 13.4% were non-families. 12.3% of all households were made up of individuals, and 3.6% had someone living alone who was 65 years of age or older. The average household size was 3.73 and the average family size was 4.08.

In the CDP, the population was spread out, with 39.1% under the age of 18, 11.0% from 18 to 24, 27.5% from 25 to 44, 15.9% from 45 to 64, and 6.6% who were 65 years of age or older. The median age was 25 years. For every 100 females, there were 105.0 males. For every 100 females age 18 and over, there were 97.8 males.

The median income for a household in the CDP was $29,211, and the median income for a family was $32,984. Males had a median income of $21,161 versus $15,104 for females. The per capita income for the CDP was $7,893. About 25.3% of families and 25.9% of the population were below the poverty line, including 26.1% of those under age 18 and 36.7% of those age 65 or over.

Education
Val Verde Park is served by the San Felipe Del Rio Consolidated Independent School District.

The whole county is served by Southwest Texas Junior College according to the Texas Education Code.

References

Census-designated places in Val Verde County, Texas
Census-designated places in Texas